On October 2, 2019, a Boeing B-17 Flying Fortress owned by the Collings Foundation crashed at Bradley International Airport, Windsor Locks, Connecticut, United States. Seven of the thirteen people on board were killed, and the other six, as well as one person on the ground, were injured. The aircraft was destroyed by fire, with only the tail and a portion of one wing remaining.

Aircraft

The aircraft was a 74-year-old Douglas-built Boeing B-17 Flying Fortress, military serial number 44-83575 (variant B-17G-85-DL) with civilian registration N93012. The aircraft was painted to represent a different B-17G, the 91st Bomb Group's Nine-O-Nine, with military serial number 42-31909 (variant B-17G-30-BO), which had been mothballed shortly after World War II at Kingman, Arizona and eventually scrapped. During its original military career, the aircraft operated as an Air-Sea Rescue aircraft until 1952, when it was reassigned to the Air Force Special Weapons Command for use as a specimen in weapons-effects testing. In this role, it was subjected to three nuclear explosions as part of Operation Tumbler–Snapper.

Following its operator's liquidation in 1985, the aircraft was acquired by the Collings Foundation in January 1986, restored to its 1945 configuration, and N93012 was flying as Nine-O-Nine by August 1986. While operated by the Collings Foundation, it was involved in two prior accidents: on August 23, 1987, it overran the runway on landing at Beaver County Airport near Pittsburgh, Pennsylvania, and on July 9, 1995, it was damaged on landing at Karl Stefan Memorial Airport in Norfolk, Nebraska, as the result of a landing gear malfunction.

The October 2019 crash and resulting fire destroyed most of the aircraft. Only the left wing and part of the tail remained.

Accident
The "living history" flight was delayed 40 minutes because of difficulty starting one of the four engines. The pilot shut down the other three engines and used a spray can of nitrogen to "blow out the moisture" in the engine that balked. The aircraft took off from Bradley International Airport in Windsor Locks, Connecticut, at 09:48 local time (13:48 UTC). It carried three crew and ten passengers. A witness reported that an engine was sputtering and smoking. At 09:50, two minutes after takeoff, the pilot radioed that there was a problem with engine number 4. The control tower diverted other traffic to allow for an emergency landing. 

The aircraft came in low, touched down  short of the runway, clipped the instrument landing system (ILS) antenna array, veered to the right off the runway across a grassy area and taxiway,  then crashed into a de-icing facility at 09:54; the aircraft then burst into flames. 

Seven occupants were killed, and the remaining six were injured severely enough to be taken to the hospital, including one who was airlifted. Among the dead were the pilot and co-pilot, aged 75 and 71 respectively. One person on the ground was injured (see below). The airport was closed for  hours after the crash.

Rescue
One of the passengers on the aircraft, a Connecticut Air National Guardsman, managed to open an escape hatch after the crash, despite having a broken arm and collarbone. An airport employee, who had been working in the building into which the aircraft had crashed, ran to the wreckage to help pull injured passengers from the burning aircraft. The employee suffered severe burns on his hands and arms and was taken by ambulance to the hospital. Construction worker Robert Bullock was working nearby at the airport when he heard the explosion and felt the heat. Hearing cries for help, the former firefighter scaled a barbed wire fence and began helping victims. He applied a tourniquet to one patient and then moved on to others until emergency medical services arrived. Bullock appeared to be uninjured during his heroic rescue. Multiple planes on the ramp contacted the control tower immediately after the accident helping to accelerate rescue efforts. Air traffic controllers contacted airport fire and rescue personnel as well as Life Star. The airport was closed to allow unrestricted access to the accident scene and began diverting incoming flights.

Investigation

The National Transportation Safety Board (NTSB) opened an investigation into the accident. A "go team" was dispatched to Bradley International Airport, headed by Jennifer Homendy. The NTSB removed some wreckage to their laboratory for further analysis, completing operations at the scene by October 8.

The NTSB issued its preliminary report on October 15, 2019. Fuel recovered from the tanks for the No. 3 engine appeared free from water and debris contamination and was consistent with 100LL avgas in smell and appearance. Still, the NTSB found no anomalies in its fuel supply or equipment, and no engine trouble was reported by pilots of other aircraft refueled from the same truck before or after the accident aircraft. During the flight, the accident pilot had reported that the No. 4 engine had a "rough mag" referring to a magneto on that engine. The NTSB reported that the propeller blades of the No. 3 engine were near the feathered position, and the propeller blades of the No. 4 engine were in the feathered position. The aircraft had landed with the flaps in the retracted position, and the landing gear extended.

In March 2020, the Federal Aviation Administration revoked the Collings Foundation's permission to carry passengers, citing numerous safety concerns and noting that allowing passengers "would adversely affect safety." Investigators found substantial shortcomings in the foundation's safety practices: key personnel were ignorant of the organization's maintenance program and "basic information concerning operations." The left magneto for the No. 4 engine had been "jury [rigged]" with safety wire and was inoperative, while the right magneto produced a weak or no spark in four of the nine cylinders it was supposed to fire. All spark plugs on both the No. 3 and No. 4 engines had been gapped improperly. They needed cleaning, and evidence of detonation was found.  The inspection of engine No. 3 also revealed problems with the cylinders.

An updated NTSB docket summary containing investigation details, testimonies, media, and medical reports was released on December 9, 2020. The final NTSB report was released on April 13, 2021, and cited pilot error as the likely cause—noting in particular, "The B-17 could likely have overflown the approach lights and landed on the runway had the pilot kept the landing gear retracted and accelerated to 120 mph until it was evident the airplane would reach the runway."—with inadequate maintenance as a contributing factor.

Legal action 
In June 2020, the families of three of the victims who were killed and five who were injured filed a wrongful death lawsuit against the Collings Foundation.  The lawsuit claimed that the Collings Foundation failed to take necessary safety precautions for a passenger flight.

References

External links

N93012, Boeing B17 – Accident Docket – NTSB
Aviation Accident Final Report: ERA20MA001 – NTSB

Boeing B-17 Flying Fortress crash
Accidental deaths in Connecticut
Aviation accidents and incidents in Connecticut 
Boeing B-17 Flying Fortress crash 
Aviation accidents and incidents involving the Boeing B-17 Flying Fortress
Boeing B-17 Flying Fortress crash
Windsor Locks, Connecticut
Events in Hartford County, Connecticut